Belakoba is a small town in Jalpaiguri Sadar subdivision of Jalpaiguri district in the Indian state of West Bengal, known for its Chamcham, a type of sweet originating in the Pora Bari locale of Bangladesh. 
Belakoba is not only a cradle to Chamcham, but also cradle to art and music.

Geography

Area overview
The map alongside shows the alluvial floodplains south of the outer foothills of the Himalayas. The area is mostly flat, except for low hills in the northern portions. It is a primarily rural area with 62.01% of the population living in rural areas and a moderate 37.99% living in the urban areas. Tea gardens in the Dooars and Terai regions produce 226 million kg or over a quarter of India's total tea crop.  Some tea gardens were identified in the 2011 census as census towns or villages. Such places are marked in the map as CT (census town) or R (rural/ urban centre). Specific tea estate pages are marked TE.

Note: The map alongside presents some of the notable locations in the subdivision. All places marked in the map are linked in the larger full screen map.

Demographics
As per 2001 census, Belakoba had a total population of 21,615. Decadal growth for the district was 21.52 per cent. Decadal growth in West Bengal was 17.84 per cent.

Transportation
Belakoba is located 17 km distance from the city of Jalpaiguri, which is the district as well as the subdivisional headquarters & 28 km from the City of Siliguri, which is the largest city in the region. The town is 446 km far from its state capital city of Kolkata. Other nearest towns are Rajganj (9.2 km), Maynaguri (24.4 km), Mal (32.9 km). Belakoba has a well-developed transportation network. The town can be accessed by rail or roads. The Belakoba railway station serves the place directly.

Healthcare
Belacoba Rural Hospital, with 30 beds at Prasannanagar, is the major government medical facility in the Jalpaiguri CD block.

Notable people 
 Ratan Lal Basu, a fiction writer in English.

References

Cities and towns in Jalpaiguri district